The 2002–03 Divizia D was the 61st season of the Liga IV, the fourth tier of the Romanian football league system. The champions of each county association promoted to Divizia C without promotion play-off.

County leagues

Arad County

Bacău County

Bihor County

Championship tie-breaker  
Minerul Ștei and Olimpia Salonta played a play-off match in order to determine the winner of Divizia D Bihor. The match tie-breaker was played on 19 June 2003 at Municipal Stadium in Oradea.

|}

Galați County

Mureș County 

Championship play-off

Neamț County

Seria I

Seria II

Championship final  

|}
Laminorul Roman II won the 2002–03 Divizia D Neamț and promoted to Divizia C.

See also 
 2002–03 Divizia A
 2002–03 Divizia B
 2002–03 Divizia C

References

External links
 FRF

Liga IV seasons
4
Romania